Beyblade: Metal Fury, known in Japan as  is the third season of the Japanese anime television series Beyblade: Metal Saga based on Takafumi Adachi's manga series Beyblade: Metal Fusion, which itself is based on the Beyblade spinning top game from Takara Tomy and Hasbro. Following directly after Beyblade: Metal Masters, the series features Gingka and company as they travel the world in search for the ten "Legendary Bladers" needed to defeat Nemesis, the God of Destruction. The 52-episode series (39 in the dub due to the merger of the second 26 episode half into 13 episodes due to their shortened 11 minute runtime) is produced by d-rights and Nelvana under the direction of Kunihisa Sugishima.

The season was first broadcast on TV Tokyo in Japan from April 3, 2011 until April 1, 2012. The season premiered in Singapore on August 19, 2012 on Cartoon Network. It later premiered in the United States on October 13, 2012 on Cartoon Network. It premiered in Canada on YTV on January 26, 2013 and in Australia on Channel Eleven on April 30, 2013. The series had its season finale on July 4, 2013, even though it had a missing episode "Orion's Whereabouts". Due to this, Channel Eleven screened it on July 5, 2013, completing the whole season.

This series aired in Finland on MTV3 from April 28 to December 27, 2013, presented with a Finnish dub.
This series began airing in India on Cartoon Network from  October 27, 2013 to 16 March 2014 broadcasting  every saturday and sunday . It premiered in Latin America on Disney XD on November 2, 2013.

Two pieces of theme music were performed for this show.

Episode list

References

Metal Fusion Season 3
2011 Japanese television seasons
2012 Japanese television seasons